

Buildings and structures

Buildings

 1619 – Børsen in Copenhagen, Denmark designed by Lorentz and Hans van Steenwinckel the Younger, is begun (completed 1640)
 1620
 Work on Santa Maria delle Grazie Tower in Xgħajra, Malta begins.
 Reconstruction of Frederiksborg Palace, Denmark, is completed by Hans van Steenwinckel the Younger following the death of his brother Lorentz.
 Skaill House on Orkney is built.
 1616–1621 – Church of St-Gervais-et-St-Protais, Paris, designed by Salomon de Brosse, is built.
 1621 – Prince's Lodging at Newmarket, Suffolk, England, designed by Inigo Jones, completed.
 1622–1628 – The Tomb of I'timād-ud-Daulah in Agra, India, is built.
 1622 – The Banqueting House, Whitehall, London, is opened with a performance of Ben Jonson's The Masque of Augurs designed by the building's architect, Inigo Jones.
 1623 – New , France, designed by Salomon de Brosse and Jean Thiriot, is built.
 1624 
St John's College Old Library, Cambridge, building is completed.
The Palace of Versailles is first built by order of King Louis XIII of France, as a hunting lodge.
 1624–1626 – Façade of Santa Maria della Vittoria, Rome, designed by Giovanni Battista Soria, is built.
 1623–1627 – Queen's Chapel at St James's Palace in London, designed by Inigo Jones, is built.
 1615–1625 – Luxembourg Palace, Paris, designed by Salomon de Brosse, is built.
 c. 1625/26 – Coymans house, Keizersgracht, Amsterdam, designed by Jacob van Campen.
 1626 – Rebuilding of Beopjusa Palsangjeon in Korea is completed.
 1627
 Palazzo Barberini in Rome begun by Carlo Maderno and Francesco Borromini (completed 1633).
 Muchalls Castle in Scotland, reconstruction completed by Thomas Burnett of Leys.
 1628
 Salzburg Cathedral in Austria, designed by Santino Solari (after Vincenzo Scamozzi), consecrated.
 George Heriot's Hospital in Edinburgh, Scotland.
 1629 – Simtokha Dzong (castle-monastery) in Bhutan.

Births
 1620: November 2 (bapt.) – Roger Pratt, English gentleman architect (died 1684)
 1621: October 2 (bapt.) – Hugh May, English architect (died 1684)

Deaths
 1620 – Bontadino de Bontadini, Bolognese-born hydraulic engineer, architect, mathematician and woodcarver, murdered
 1626: December 9 – Salomon de Brosse, French architect (born 1571)
 1627: July 17 – Lieven de Key, Dutch architect (born 1560)
 1629: January 30 – Carlo Maderno, Ticinese-born architect (born 1556)

References

Architecture